Kelly Dyer (born March 1, 1966 in Princeton, New Jersey and raised in Acton, Massachusetts) is a member of the Northeastern University athletics Hall of Fame, and a former ice hockey goaltender for the United States women's national ice hockey team.

Youth
Dyer grew up in Acton, Massachusetts and was a figure skater for the younger years of her life before taking up ice hockey. On why she became a goaltender, “I grew up in a neighborhood with boys who liked to play hockey. They stuck me in goal and shot things at me,” she says. “And I liked it.” Dyer went on the play with the boys during high school, and was on the same team with players such as Tom Barrasso, Jeff Norton, and Bob Sweeney.

Northeastern University
Dyer enrolled at Northeastern where she became a backstop for a Northeastern team that won back-to-back ECAC championships, the de facto National Championship at the time as there was no NCAA tournament yet. Dyer had a career 2.04 goals against average and was the team MVP her final two seasons and posted a record of 48-3-1.

National team and the pros
Dyer was a four-time member of the United States women's national ice hockey team in 1990, 1991, 1994, and 1995, amassing three World Championship silver medals.

Dyer is also one of six women to play men's professional ice hockey. She played as the goaltender for the West Palm Beach Blaze where her team won three Sunshine Hockey League championships.

Retirement
Dyer retired from ice hockey in 1996 when she became a product manager for Louisville Hockey.

References

External links

GoNU.com Hall of Fame Profile

1966 births
Living people
American women's ice hockey goaltenders
Ice hockey players from Massachusetts
Ice hockey players from New Jersey
Jacksonville Bullets players
Northeastern Huskies women's ice hockey players
People from Acton, Massachusetts
People from Princeton, New Jersey
Sportspeople from Middlesex County, Massachusetts
Sportspeople from Mercer County, New Jersey